Amador Obordo (died 1945) was a Filipino basketball player. He competed in the men's tournament at the 1936 Summer Olympics. He was killed during World War II.

References

External links
 

Year of birth missing
1945 deaths
People from Capiz
Philippines men's national basketball team players
Filipino men's basketball players
Olympic basketball players of the Philippines
Basketball players at the 1936 Summer Olympics
Place of birth missing
Filipino military personnel killed in World War II
Deaths by airstrike during World War II